Viprachitti is a danava featured in Hindu literature, a son of Kashyapa and Danu. According to the Mahabharata, he becomes the king of the Danavas after his brother Puloman was killed by Indra. Viprachitti marries Siṃhikā, who is the sister of Hiranyakashipu and a daughter of Diti.

He has a son named Svarbhanu. His army is stated to have defeated the devas under the guidance of Svarbhanu.

Incarnation
Viprachitti later incarnates as Jarasandha in the Mahabharata.

See also
Vemacitrin
Danava
Svarbhanu

References

Works based on the Mahabharata
Danavas
Hinduism
Hindu mythology